Oskar may refer to:

 oskar (gene), the Drosophila gene
 Oskar (given name), masculine given name

See also
 Oscar (disambiguation)